Pakistan is one of the world's most ethnically and linguistically diverse countries. The major Pakistani ethnolinguistic groups include Punjabis, Pashtuns, Sindhis, Saraikis, Muhajirs, Balochs, Paharis and Brahuis, with significant numbers of Kashmiris, Chitralis, Shina, Baltis, Kohistanis, Torwalis, Hazaras, Burusho, Wakhis, Kalash, Siddis, Uzbeks, Nuristanis, Pamiris, Hazarewal and other various minorities.

Pakistan's census does not include the 1.4 million citizens of Afghanistan who are temporarily residing in Pakistan. The majority of them were born in Pakistan within the last four decades and mostly belong to the Pashtun ethnic group. They also include Tajiks, Uzbeks and others.

Major ethnic groups

Punjabis

Punjabis are an Indo-Aryan ethnolinguistic group associated with the Punjab region in South Asia. They are the largest ethnic group of Pakistan.

Traditionally, Punjabi identity is primarily linguistic, geographical and cultural. Its identity is independent of historical origin or religion and refers to those who reside in the Punjab region or associate with its population and those who consider the Punjabi language their mother tongue. Integration and assimilation are important parts of Punjabi culture, since Punjabi identity is not based solely on tribal connections.

Pashtuns

Pashtuns are an Iranian ethnolinguistic group and are Pakistan's second largest ethnicity. They speak Pashto as their first language and are divided into multiple tribes such as Afridi, Yousafzai and Khattak, which are notably the main Pashtun tribes in Pakistan. They make up an estimated 38 million of Pakistan's total population and are mostly adherent to Sunni Islam. Notable Pashtuns include former president Ayub Khan, former prime minister Imran Khan, cricketers Shahid Afridi and Shaheen Afridi, actor Fawad Khan and Nobel Laureate Malala Yousafzai.

Sindhis 

The Sindhis are an Indo-Aryan ethnolinguistic group who speak the Sindhi language and are native to the Sindh province of Pakistan. Sindhis are predominantly Muslim, but have a minority Hindu population, making up the largest Hindu minority population in Pakistan. Sindhi Muslim culture is highly influenced by Sufi doctrines and principles and some of the popular cultural icons of Sindh are Shah Abdul Latif Bhitai, Lal Shahbaz Qalandar, Jhulelal and Sachal Sarmast.

Saraikis

The Saraikis are an Indo-Aryan ethnolinguistic group inhabiting parts of central and southeastern Pakistan, primarily in the southern part of the Pakistani province of Punjab. They are mainly found in Derajat, a cultural region of central Pakistan, located in the region where the provinces of Punjab, Khyber Pakhtunkhwa, and Balochistan meet. Derajat is bound by the Indus River and the Sulaiman Mountains to the west.

Muhajirs

Muhajirs (meaning "migrants"), also called "Urdu-speaking people" are a collective multiethnic group who emerged through the migration of Indian Muslims from various parts of India to Pakistan starting in 1947, as a result of the world's largest mass migration. The majority of Muhajirs are settled in Sindh mainly in Karachi, Hyderabad, Sukkur and Mirpur Khas. Sizable communities of Muhajirs are also present in cities including Lahore, Multan, Islamabad, and Peshawar. Muhajirs held a dominating position during the early nation building years of Pakistan and many of Pakistan's founders were Muhajirs. The term Muhajir is also used for descendants of Muslims who migrated to Pakistan after the 1947 partition of India. Notable Muhajirs include Muhammad Ali Jinnah, Liaquat Ali Khan, Abdul Qadeer Khan, Pervez Musharraf, Hakeem Muhammad Saeed and Abdul Sattar Edhi. Muhajirs are seen as the most educated and literate ethnic group in Pakistan.

Baloch
The Baloch are an Iranic ethnolinguistic group, and are principally found in the south of Balochistan province of Pakistan. Despite living in the southeastern side towards the Indian subcontinent for centuries, they are classified as a northwestern Iranian people in accordance to their language which belongs to the northwestern subgroup of Iranian languages.

According to Dr. Akhtar Baloch, Professor at University of Karachi, the Balochis migrated from Balochistan during the Little Ice Age and settled in Sindh and Punjab. The Little Ice Age is conventionally defined as a period extending from the sixteenth to the nineteenth centuries or alternatively, from 1300 to 1850, although climatologists and historians working with local records no longer expect to agree on either the start or end dates of this period, which varied according to local conditions. According to Professor Baloch, the climate of Balochistan was very cold and the region was uninhabitable during the winter so the Baloch people migrated in waves and settled in Sindh and Punjab.

Brahuis
The Brahui, Brahvi or Brohi, are an ethnic group principally found in Balochistan, Pakistan. They speak the Brahui language, which belongs to the Dravidian language family, although ethnically they tend to identify as Baloch.

They are a small minority group in Afghanistan, where they are native, but they are also found through their diaspora in Middle Eastern states. They mainly occupy the area in Balochistan from Bolan Pass through the Bolan Hills to Ras Muari (Cape Monze) on the Arabian sea, separating the Baloch people living to the east and west. The Brahuis are almost entirely Sunni Muslims.

See also
 Demographics of Pakistan
 Languages of Pakistan
 Pakistanis
 Indo-Iranian peoples

Notes

References

Works cited
 

 (access limited).